Mahisagar is an Indian drama television series which premiered on 7 October 2013 on BIG Magic and ended on 15 April 2015 with 400 episodes.  The series is produced by J.D. Majethia of Hats Off Productions. It stars Anuj Thakur and Dharti Bhatt. It started re-airing on Big Magic from 24 February 2023 at 2pm.

Seasons

Theme 
MahiSagar is a rib-tickling show which revolves around the life of a sweet, carefree small-town girl who is pitted against her politically distinguished mother-in-law.

Plot
Mahi (Dharti Bhatt) simple care-free and academically weak girl, who lived in Verakhadi a small village in Gujarat, marries an Ahmedabad handsome and intelligent Sagar Mehta(Sandit Tiwari later Anuj Thakur) under circumstances and falls in love with him. Post marriage, they move to  Sagar's home in Ahmedabad. At his home, lives his  brother Rohit Mehta an abroad studied and settled and his wife Soniya Mehta who aspires to a Bollywood actress who is not good at using brains but is modern and up-to-date. Ansuya Mehta(Anahita Jahabaksh later Vandana Pathak) a loyal, praiseworthy and modern politician and Sagar's and Rohit's mother. Ansuya didn't accept Mahi at first but later accepted her but wants her to leave her old fashioned culture and become a modern daughter in law. Also Ansuya' husband Rajiv, her sister Bindu and the family chef Kanhaiyalal also give this story a perfect balance. 
Each episode is different and portrays different comic situations of life and few social  and political aspects also with some of their own fantasies and moreover challenge's between Mahi and Ansuya and how Sagar is getting through his life in the midst.

Cast

Main
Dharti Bhatt as Mahi Sagar Mehta (2013-2015)
Anahita Jahanbaksh as Anusuya Rajiv Mehta(2013-2014)
Vandana Pathak replaced Jahanbaksh.(2014-2015)
Sandit Tiwari as Sagar Rajiv Mehta.(2013-2014)
Anuj Thakur replaced Tiwari.(2014-2015)

Recurring 
 Milind Joshi as Rajiv Mehta. (2014)
Ankur Malhotra as Rohit Rajiv Mehta (2013,2014,2015)
Namrata Dhameja as Soniya Rohit Mehta (2013-2015)
Amish Tanna as Kanhaiya lal, Mehta's house help.(2014-2015)
 Muskaan Sayed as Bindu, Anusuya's younger unmarried sister(2014)
 Paresh Bhatt as Mayank Bindu's boyfriend turned Husband.(2014)
 Bharat Thakkar as Bapuji, Mahi and Hemu's father, a pujari. (2013, 2014)
 Pravin Asthana as Pravin Bhai, Mehta family's cook before Kanhaiyalal. (2013)
 Jay Sondagar as Sagar's friend.

Cameo 
 Anang Desai as Mr. Anang Desai, Anusuya's friend's husband (episode 46 & 47)
 Rajashri Nikam as Kaushalya Desai, Anusuya's friend.(episode 46 & 47)
 Vandana Pathak as herself, Anusuya's friend (episode 46 & 47)
 Vinayak Ketkar as various characters.
 Jayshree Mehta as Fake Guru Mata (Episode 62)
 Bhairavi Vaidya as Danger Dadi
 Deepak Pareek as Anusuya's college professor

Episodes 
 Episode 1 - 100

Episode 101 - 200

Episode 201 - 300

Episode 301 - 400

Season 2
Due to immense success of Mahisagar, JD Majethia produced its second season as Naya Mahisagar with comedy and supernatural fantasy genre which started on 22 February 2016 and ended on 8 August 2016 with 119 episodes due to low TRP's.

References

Indian drama television series
Big Magic original programming
2013 Indian television series debuts
2015 Indian television series endings
Hats Off Productions